David Baker may refer to:

Arts and entertainment
 David Baker (composer) (1931–2016), American symphonic jazz composer
 David Baker (singer), former lead singer for Mercury Rev
 David Baker (poet) (born 1954), American poet
 David Erskine Baker (1730–1767), English drama critic
 David Aaron Baker (born 1963), American actor and audiobook narrator
 David Baker (born 1931), Australian film director and writer of Libido
 David James Baker, American filmmaker

Law and politics
 David Gordon Baker (1884–1958), justice of the South Carolina Supreme Court
 David J. Baker (1792–1869), US Senator from Illinois
David Hume Baker (1841–1916), state legislator in Kentucky and then Florida
 David J. Baker Jr. (1834–1899), American judge, son of David J. Baker
 David L. Baker, justice of the Iowa Supreme Court
 David Martin Baker (1923–2010), Republican member of West Virginia State House of Delegates
 Dave Baker (Minnesota politician) (born 1962), Minnesota politician
 David Baker (activist), American activist and founder of Community Against Pollution
Dave Baker (Kansas politician), member of the Kansas House of Representatives

Religion
 Augustine Baker (1575–1641), English Benedictine mystic, born David Baker
 David Bristow Baker (1803–1852), English religious writer

Science
 David Baker (biochemist) (born 1962), American biochemist
 David H. Baker (animal nutritionist) (1939–2009), American animal nutritionist
 David Baker (aerospace engineer), aerospace engineer, co-author of the Mars Direct proposal
 David Baker-Gabb, ornithologist
 David Baker (author) (born 1944), British space scientist and author

Sports
 Dave Baker (American football) (1937–2002), American football player
 Dave Baker (baseball) (born 1956), baseball player
 David Baker (cricketer, born 1935), English cricketer
 David Baker (cricketer, born 1945), English cricketer
 David Baker (cyclist) (born 1965), British Olympic mountainbike racer
 David Baker (track cyclist) (born 1965), English Commonwealth Games cyclist
 Paul Baker (footballer) (David Paul Baker, born 1963), English professional footballer
 C. David Baker, former President & CEO of the Pro Football Hall of Fame; former commissioner of the Arena Football League

Other
 David Baker (architect) (born 1949), American architect
 David Baker (academic and musician) (born 1952), British academic librarian and organist
 David William Baker (born 1959), British businessman
 David Baker (detective), introductory use of DNA profiling
 David ODB Baker (born 1972), American professional poker player
 David Bakes Baker (born 1986), American professional poker player